pacificUV is an indie rock band currently residing in Athens, Georgia.  Their style is frequently categorized as utilizing elements of dream pop, post-rock, shoegazing and space rock.  They are currently signed to Mazarine Records.

History
The band was formed in Athens, Georgia in 1998.  Founding members include Howard Hudson, Clay Jordan, and Lucas Jensen.  Their first full-length record (which was titled Longplay 1 when originally pressed on compact-disc, but was later renamed with an eponymous title) was released on WARM Recordings in 2002, and was produced by Andy LeMaster (member of Now It's Overhead).

After a national tour, and nearly universal acclaim for their debut record (including praise from Rolling Stone Magazine, who called the album a "masterpiece"), the initial formation of the band dissolved.  Jordan relocated to Portland and enlisted the help of Mike Erwin (7 Years In Space), Kevin Davis (of Glowworm), Jesse Robert W. (also of Glowworm), and Matt Kline.  Shortly after the Portland lineup was solidified, WARM released a 4-song EP featuring three unreleased tracks and an Eluvium remix of L.A.P.D. vs N.Y.P.D.

In February 2008, the band released their second full-length LP, titled Longplay 2.  The record features vocals by Carolyn Berk (of Lovers) and the artwork of Chris A'lurede.  It was recorded by Adam Selzer (of Norfolk & Western) and Jason Powers at Type Foundry Studios in Portland.  It was mixed by Jeff Stuart Saltzman and mastered by Roger Seibel. 

The pacificUV song "Alarmist" was featured in the 2009 season-finale of the Showtime drama Californication. 

In 2011 pacificUV released the EP "Chrysalis," their first release on Athens, Georgia-based label Mazarine Records.

In 2012 pacificUV released "Weekends," their third studio LP and second release on Mazarine Records.

Discography

Studio albums
 Pacific UV - 2002 - WARM Records (also known as Longplay 1)
 Longplay 2 - 2008 - WARM Records
 Weekends - 2012 - Mazarine Records
 After the Dream You Are Awake - 2013 - Mazarine Records

EPs
 Pacific UV EP - 2006 - WARM Records
 Chrysalis - 2011 - Mazarine Records

Notes

Musical groups established in 1998
Indie rock musical groups from Georgia (U.S. state)
Sadcore and slowcore groups
Warm Electronic Recordings artists